The 2020 St. Francis Brooklyn Terriers men's soccer team represent St. Francis College during the 2020 NCAA Division I men's soccer season. The Terrier's home games are played at Brooklyn Bridge Park, Pier 5. The team has been a member of the Northeast Conference since 1981 and is coached by Tom Giovatto, who was in his fourteenth year at the helm of the Terriers.

Due to the COVID-19 pandemic the season was delayed to Spring 2021 and shortened to only 7 conference games. The Terriers finished regular season play at 5–1–1 and won the NEC Regular Season Championship. The NEC Tournament only featured #1 seed St. Francis Brooklyn and #2 seed LIU Sharks in a single-game championship, which St. Francis won in double overtime on penalty kicks.  The Terriers then advanced to the 2020 NCAA Division I Men's Soccer Tournament where they defeated the Milwaukee Panthers in the first round. The Terriers then lost to nationally ranked Indiana in overtime in the second round of the tournament.

2020 squad

As of May 3, 2021.

   

  

    

    

 

  

          

 

 

Captains in bold

Schedule

Northeast Conference

Northeast conference tournament

NCAA Division I Men's Soccer Championship

See also 

 St. Francis Brooklyn Terriers men's soccer
 2020 NCAA Division I men's soccer season
 Northeast Conference Men's Soccer Tournament
 2020 NCAA Division I Men's Soccer Tournament

References 

2020
2020 Northeast Conference men's soccer season
American men's college soccer teams 2020 season
2020 in sports in New York City
2020 NCAA Division I Men's Soccer Tournament participants